Sri Ramanujar is a 1938 Indian, Tamil language film and was directed by A. Narayanan. The film featured Sangu Subramaniam, N. Seethalakshmi, N. Ramarathinam and others.

Plot 
The film portrayed the life story of Hindu theologian, philosopher Ramanuja.

Cast 
The following list was adapted from the database of Film News Anandan

Male cast
Sangu Subramaniam
N. Ramarathinam
Srinivasa Varadhan
N. Pichumoorthy
Chellappa (not V. A. Chellappa)

Female cast
N. Seethalakshmi
R. Kamalambal
G. A. Gnanambal
T. S. Krishnaveni

Production 
The film was produced by Seethalakshmi under the banner S. S. Films and Srinivasa Cinetone. The film was directed by A. Narayanan. Va. Raa. wrote the dialogues. Velappan was in charge of cinematography while the editing was done by N. K. Gopal. Meenakshi Narayanan handled the audiography.

A short film titled Athirshta Nakshathiram was also shown along with the main film.

Soundtrack 
There were no separate music directors at that period. Lyrics were penned by Bharathidasan while the actors themselves rendered the songs with the company orchestra as background music.

References 

1938 films
1930s Tamil-language films
Hindu devotional films